Nummela may refer to:

 Nummela (Vihti), the central district of the Finnish municipality of Vihti
 Nummela Airfield, see list of airports in Finland
 2502 Nummela, an asteroid named after the town
 Nummela (album), an album by Anssi Kela, named after the town

People with the surname 
 Matti Nummela (born 1955), Finnish sport shooter
 Petri Nummela (born 1971), Finnish sport shooter